Hu Ping (1 July 1930 – 4 August 2020) was a Chinese politician.

Biography
Born in Jiaxing, Zhejiang, he was a member of the Chinese Communist Party and was Governor of Fujian from 1983 to 1987. He was also the Minister of Commerce from 1988 to 1993.

Hu died on 4 August 2020 in Beijing, aged 90  .

References

1930 births
2020 deaths
People from Jiaxing
Governors of Fujian
People's Republic of China politicians from Zhejiang
Chinese Communist Party politicians from Zhejiang
Politicians from Jiaxing
Alternate members of the 12th Central Committee of the Chinese Communist Party
Members of the 12th Central Committee of the Chinese Communist Party
Members of the 13th Central Committee of the Chinese Communist Party
Members of the 14th Central Committee of the Chinese Communist Party
Members of the Standing Committee of the 8th Chinese People's Political Consultative Conference
Members of the Standing Committee of the 9th Chinese People's Political Consultative Conference